The 1942–43 Northern Rugby Football Union season was the fourth season of the rugby league’s Wartime Emergency Leagues necessitated by the Second World War.

As in the previous wartime season, clubs played a different number of games and several clubs dropped out. Only 14 of the original pre-war clubs participated with only three; Oldham, St Helens and Wigan from west of the Pennines.

Season summary
The 1942–43 season began on Saturday 5 September 1942. As in the previous season, there are still only the three Lancashire clubs who have not had to close down and withdraw from the League, the Northern Rugby League continued with a single (now) 14 club single Competition. As the clubs are still playing different number of marches, the league positions and the title would be decided on a percentage basis.

At the completion of the regular season Wigan were on top of the league with a percentage success of 81.25% and Dewsbury were a close second (78.12%). Although Bradford Northern won more games than anyone else their percentage success was only 73.80%, and consequently they finished third. St Helens finished 14th out of the 14 clubs with only 2 wins from 15 . Dewsbury went on to defeat Halifax 33–16 on aggregate in the play-off final and win the Championship (for the second consecutive season), however the Championship was declared null and void as the Dewsbury had fielded an ineligible player in the semi-final.

The Wartime Emergency Leagues did not count as an official league championship.

In the Rugby league Challenge Cup Final, Dewsbury beat Leeds 16–15 on aggregate over two legs in front of an aggregate crowd of 26,470.

With the Lancashire Cup suspended the duration of the war, Wigan competed in the Yorkshire Cup.  The cup was won by Dewsbury who beat Huddersfield 7–2 on aggregate before an aggregate crowd of 17,252 in the two low scoring legs of the final

Change in participation

Previous withdrawals
The following clubs had withdrawn from the League, before this season began:
St Helens Recs – who folded before the war started.
Barrow – withdrew after the end of the first (1939–40) season finished and did not rejoin until the 1943–44 season.
Hull Kingston Rovers – who withdrew after the end of the first (1939–40) season finished and did not rejoin until the 1945–46 season.
Rochdale Hornets – As Hull Kingston Rovers.
Widnes – As Hull Kingston Rovers.
Broughton Rangers – withdrew early in the 1941–42 season and did not rejoin until the 1945–46 season.
Liverpool Stanley – withdrew after the end of the 1940–41 season and did not rejoin until the 1945–46 season.
Salford – As Liverpool Stanley.  In November 1942, manager Lance Todd was killed in a car crash. 
Swinton – As Liverpool Stanley.
Warrington – As Liverpool Stanley. 
Leigh - During the Second World War, the club was forced to leave its ground as the adjacent cable factory extended onto the land.

Withdrawals since the 1941–42 season
Bramley – did not rejoin until the 1945–46 season.
Castleford – re-joined for the 1944–45 season.
Hunslet –  re-joined for the 1943–44 season.

Championship

Championship play-offs

Qualifying game
On 1 May 1943 Bradford Northern beat Huddersfield 16–13 at Odsal Stadium, Bradford in the qualifying game.

Semi-finals
The semi-finals were played on 8 May 1943. Wigan  lost 3–13 to Halifax at Central Park, Wigan. In the other game Bradford Northern beat Dewsbury 8–3 at Odsal. After the game Dewsbury submitted a protest to the Rugby Football League and Bradford Northern were disqualified for fielding an ineligible player.

Final
The first leg was played on 15 May 1943 Dewsbury beat Halifax 11–3 at Crown Flatt, Dewsbury.

The second leg was played the following Saturday, 22 May 1943 and Dewbury won again this time 22–13 at Thrum Hall, Halifax in front of a crowd of 9,700.

Dewsbury won 33–16 on aggregate but at a meeting of the RFL committee in July the championship was declared null and void. The committee heard a complaint submitted by Bradford Northern that in the semi-final between them and Dewsbury, Dewsbury had also fielded an ineligible player.  The complaint was upheld, the championship was voided, Dewsbury's title win was removed from the list of Championship wins and the club were fined £100.

Challenge Cup

Barrow who had not entered the League programme, took part in this competition. In the final Dewsbury beat Leeds 16–15 on aggregate over two legs in front of an aggregate crowd of 26,470.

References 

1942 in English rugby league
1943 in English rugby league
Northern Rugby Football League seasons